Anshelm Schultzberg (28 September 1862 – 27 February 1945) was a Swedish painter. His work was part of the painting event in the art competition at the 1932 Summer Olympics.

References

1862 births
1945 deaths
20th-century Swedish painters
Swedish male painters
Olympic competitors in art competitions
People from Falun
20th-century Swedish male artists